Aleksei Igorevich Mamonov (born 14 April 1993) is a Russian professional football player.

Club career
He made his Russian Premier League debut for FC Volga Nizhny Novgorod on 13 May 2012 in a game against FC Amkar Perm.

References

External links
 

1993 births
Sportspeople from Poltava
Living people
Russian footballers
Russia youth international footballers
Association football defenders
Russian Premier League players
FC Volga Nizhny Novgorod players
FC Solyaris Moscow players
FC Lokomotiv Moscow players
FC Akhmat Grozny players
FC Veles Moscow players